Sarah Das is an American glaciologist and climate scientist. She works at the Woods Hole Oceanographic Institute in Woods Hole, Massachusetts.

Education 
Das holds a Ph.D. in Geosciences from Pennsylvania State University and a Bachelor of Arts in Geological Sciences from Cornell University.

Scholarship 
Das' research interests are in glaciology and paleoclimatology, and teaching interests are in polar science, climate change, and experiential outdoor science education.

Her scholarly contributions have been featured in journals such as Nature, and circulated in news media such as CNN, USA Today, Forbes, National Geographic, and The Guardian. She also has been leading scientific expeditions to the polar ice sheets for over 25 years. She is a principal investigator at the Disko Bay Ice Coring Project.

Her research with the Woodwell Climate Research Center was presented at the Conference of Parties or COP26 titled "Refreeze the Arctic: Increasing our Ambition to Maintain a Safe and Stable Climate."

She has studied Greenland ice cores, to study climate history, She documented increasing melt rates.

Das has served on the U.S. National Academies Polar Research Board.

Works

References

External links 
 What We Know Sarah Das, American Association for the Advancement of Science.
 PolarConnect Event with Erin Towns and Dr. Sarah Das from Ilulissat, Greenland, PolarTREC, May 11, 2022
 Interview with Glaciologist Sarah Das  Exploratorium, July 21, 2008

American climate activists
Living people
Woods Hole Oceanographic Institution
Pennsylvania State University alumni
Cornell University alumni
Year of birth missing (living people)